Isac Elías Talancha Loyola (born 9 December 2003) is a Peruvian footballer who plays as a midfielder for Peruvian Primera División club Alianza Universidad.

Career statistics

Club

Notes

References

2003 births
Living people
People from Huánuco
Peruvian footballers
Association football midfielders
Alianza Universidad footballers